The 2013 Fast5 Netball World Series was the fifth staging of the annual Netball World Series, and the second to be played under the new Fast5 rules, which replaced the older fastnet rules introduced in 2009. The tournament was held at Vector Arena in Auckland for the second year in a row.

The 2013 tournament was contested by the top six national netball teams in 2013. Hosts New Zealand defeated Australia in the Grand Final by 56 to 27, to record their fourth overall series victory in the tournament.

Tournament overview

Date and Venue
The 2013 Fast5 Netball World Series was played in Auckland, New Zealand over three days, from 8-10 November. All matches were held at Vector Arena, which has a capacity of 12,000.

Format
20 matches were played over three days, under the Fast5 rules of netball. Each team played each other once during the first two days in a round-robin format. The four highest-scoring teams from this stage progressed to the finals, played on the final day of competition, in which the 1st-ranked team played the 4th-ranked team, while 2nd played 3rd. The winners of these two matches contested the Grand Final; the remaining teams contested the third-fourth place playoff match and fifth-sixth place playoff match.

Teams
The tournament was contested by the six top national netball teams in the world, according to the INF World Rankings: New Zealand, Australia, England, Jamaica, Malawi and South Africa.

Draw and results
Source: Fast5 2013 Series Results

Round robin table
1. New Zealand (5 wins, 0 losses, 0 draws) 
2. Jamaica (3 wins, 1 loss, 1 draw) 
3. Australia (2 wins, 2 losses, 1 draw) 
4. South Africa (2 wins, 3 losses, 0 draws) 
---  
5. Malawi (1 win, 4 losses, 0 draws)  
6. England (1 wins, 4 losses, 0 draws)

Final Placings

References

2013
Fast5
Fast5
2013 in Australian netball
2013 in New Zealand netball
2013 in English netball
2013 in South African women's sport
2013 in Malawian sport
2013 in Jamaican sport